Della E. Whitney Norton (January 1, 1840 - January 23, 1937) was a poet, author and Christian Scientist.

Early life
Della E. Whitney was  born in Fort Edward, New York, on January 1, 1840. She was educated mainly in Fort Edward Academy.

Career
Della Whitney Norton started to write at an early age. Before her twelfth year she was a regular contributor, as Della E. Whitney, to several Boston and New York papers and magazines. The Boston Cultivator published her first literary efforts. Afterward she contributed to The Galaxy, Scribner's Magazine, The Ladies' Repository, the Christian Union, the Advance, the Boston Repository and other journals.

The International Sunday-School Association offered prizes for the best hymns on the lessons for the year. Norton wrote fifty-nine hymns in about ten days, which were accepted, and among eight-hundred competitors she won three first prizes.

Madame Parepa Rosa, the Italian prima donna, sent her manager on a journey of five-hundred miles to request of Norton a song for concert purposes, when Norton wrote the humorous poem, "Do Not Slam the Gate" which was sung and published the world over.

In spite of delicate health, she was always identified with every good work in church, society and humanitarian directions. The Woman's Christian Temperance Union, Woman Suffrage Association, Woman's Relief Corps, Woman's Industrial Exchange, hospital boards and private charities absorbed her time for many years to the almost entire exclusion of literary labor.

After surgeons and physicians failed to help, her health was fixed by her faith on God as a healing power, and since then she gave her whole time to the work of healing others, and preaching the gospel of Christian Science, in private and public, as revealed to her in the Scripture, and demonstrated through the restoration of the blind and lame, the diseased and deformed, the conversion of infidels and the cure of the evil of intemperance and kindred habits. She was ordained for the public ministry.

Personal life
Della Whitney Norton became an invalid when thirteen years of age, and for many years suffered excruciatingly. In January, 1874, she married Henry B. Norton (1842-1925), of Rochester, New York. She had one son, Frank Whitney Norton.

She lived in Minneapolis, Minnesota.

She died on January 23, 1937, and is buried at Lakewood Cemetery, Minneapolis.

References

1840 births
1937 deaths
19th-century American poets
Burials at Lakewood Cemetery
People from Fort Edward, New York
Woman's Relief Corps people
19th-century American women writers
American Christian Scientists
Wikipedia articles incorporating text from A Woman of the Century